Patricia Ann Locantore-Ford (born September 27, 1955), also known as Dr. Patricia Ford, is an American physician, oncologist, hematologist and Director for the Center of Bloodless Medicine at Pennsylvania Hospital in Philadelphia. She is widely considered the pioneer for bloodless surgery and medicine. In 1995, she performed the first bloodless stem cell transplant.

Ford has performed the procedure over 700 times and teaches this technique to doctors all over the world.

In 2001, Ford founded the Society for the Advancement of Blood Management (S.A.B.M.) organization and directs its annual meeting, geared towards educated thousands of doctors and patients about bloodless medicine.

Education and training 
Ford received her B.A. in Science from Barry University in 1983 and her medical degree from University of Miami's Miller School of Medicine in 1987.

She trained as an intern at Internal Medicine at Graduate Hospital from 1987–1988. She then trained as a resident at the Internal Medicine at Graduate Hospital from 1988–1990. She did her fellowship at Hematology/Oncology at Temple University Hospital and Fox Chase Cancer Center from 1990–1993. She then trained as a Chief Fellow at the Hematology/Oncology at Fox Chase Cancer Center from 1992–1993.

References 

1955 births
Living people
American hematologists
Barry University alumni
Leonard M. Miller School of Medicine alumni
Women hematologists
20th-century American women physicians
20th-century American physicians
21st-century American women physicians
21st-century American physicians